Lights, Camera, Action, the traditional cue to a film crew at the beginning of a take, may refer to:

Games
Lights...Camera...Action! (pinball) 1989 pinball game
 Animaniacs: Lights, Camera, Action!, a 2005 video game for the Nintendo DS and Game Boy Advance
 Scene It? Lights, Camera, Action, a 2007 video game for the Xbox 360

Film and television
 Standby...Lights! Camera! Action!, a 1980s television series
 "Lights, Camera, Action", the third season of the television show The Wiggles

Music
 "Lights, Camera, Action", a song by Remy Ma from There's Something About Remy: Based on a True Story
 "Lights, Camera, Action", a song by The Game (rapper) The Black Wallstreet, Vol. 12006
 "Lights, Camera, Action!", a song by Mr. Cheeks
 Lights, Camera, Action, an album by Chico Slimani

Other uses
 Lights! Camera! Action! Hosted by Steven Spielberg, a show attraction located in Universal Studios Singapore
 Lights, Camera, Action, a novel in the High School Musical book series

See also
 Lights, Camera, Action!: Extreme Stunt Show, a live stunt show performed at Walt Disney Studios Park